Karin Sendel (born 26 October 1988) is an Israeli women's footballer who plays as a midfielder for Ligat Nashim club FC Ramat HaSharon. She has previously played for Maccabi Holon, as well as having spells in the NCAA, with both the Ohio State Buckeyes and the UNC Greensboro Spartans, and in Iceland. She is the captain of the Israel national team, where she made her debut at the 2007 World Cup Qualifiers.

Early life
Sendel was born in Rishon LeZion and raised in Kiryat Tivon to an Ashkenazi Jewish family. Her sister is Israeli actress, singer, and television host Shiran Sendel.

Club career
Sendel started playing football with a local team in Kiryat Tiv'on, later moving to play for Maccabi Holon, with which she played intermittently until 2014 and won 6 championships and 8 cups, as well as appearing in Uefa Women's Cup for a total of 11 matches. In 2008 Sendel signed to play for Stjarnan in Iceland, making a total of 16 appearances for the club, before returning to play for Maccabi Holon in Israel.

In 2009 Sendel moved to the U.S. and attended Ohio State University, playing for the Ohio State Buckeyes. Two years later Sendel started attending the University of North Carolina and played for the UNC Greensboro Spartans. During this period Sendel was still registered with Maccabi Holon and played a handful of matches with the club each season.

In 2013 Sendel once again transferred to Iceland, this time playing for Fylkir's women's team in the Icelandic second division, aiding the team achieving promotion to the top division, after which Sendel return to Maccabi Holon. At the beginning of the 2014–15 season Sendel transferred from Maccabi Holon to F.C. Ramat HaSharon.

International career
Sendel made her debut for the Israel women's national football team in 2005 against Moldova and so far played 26 matches for the national team. Sendel also played for the U-19 national team, making 12 appearances between 2004 and 2006, scoring one goal

Honours
Championships (6):
 2002–03, 2004–05 , 2005–06, 2006–07, 2007–08, 2008–09
Cup (8):
 2002–03, 2003–04, 2004–05, 2005–06, 2006–07, 2007–08, 2008–09, 2012–13
 Icelandic Second Division (1):
 2013

References

External links

1986 births
Living people
Footballers from Rishon LeZion
People from Kiryat Tiv'on
Israeli women's footballers
Women's association football midfielders
Maccabi Holon F.C. (women) players
Stjarnan women's football players
Ohio State Buckeyes women's soccer players
UNC Greensboro Spartans athletes
College women's soccer players in the United States
F.C. Ramat HaSharon players
Ligat Nashim players
Israel women's international footballers
Israeli expatriate sportspeople in Iceland
Expatriate women's footballers in Iceland
Israeli expatriate sportspeople in the United States
Expatriate women's soccer players in the United States
Jewish footballers
Jewish Israeli sportspeople
Jewish sportswomen
Israeli Ashkenazi Jews